Lisa Marie Nolte (born 5 February 2001) is a German field hockey player.

Career

Club level
In club competition, Nolte plays for Düsseldorfer in the German Bundesliga.

Junior national team
Lisa Nolte made her debut for the German U–21 team in 2019. Her first appearance was during a three nations series Mönchengladbach and Viersen. Later that year, she went on to win a bronze medal with the team at the EuroHockey Junior Championship in Valencia.

In 2022, Nolte was named captain of the junior squad for the postponed FIH Junior World Cup in Potchefstroom.

Die Honamas
Nolte made her debut for Die Danas in 2019, during a test series against Argentina in Buenos Aires. 

She has since gone on to represent Germany in the FIH Pro League.

References

External links
 
 

2001 births
Living people
German female field hockey players
Female field hockey midfielders
21st-century German women